INS Chatak (K96) was a Chamak class missile boat of the Indian Navy.

References

Chamak-class missile boats
Fast attack craft of the Indian Navy
1977 ships
Museum ships in India